Badis may refer to:

Badis (town), a ruined town in Morocco
Badis (fish), a genus of fishes in the family Badidae

See also
Badi (disambiguation)